The Irrawaddy River ( Ayeyarwady River; , , from Indic revatī, meaning "abounding in riches") is a river that flows from north to south through Myanmar (Burma). It is the country's largest river and most important commercial waterway. Originating from the confluence of the N'mai and Mali rivers, it flows relatively straight North-South before emptying through the Irrawaddy Delta in the Ayeyarwady Region into the Andaman Sea. Its drainage basin of about  covers a large part of Burma. After Rudyard Kipling's poem, it is sometimes referred to as 'The Road to Mandalay'.

As early as the sixth century, the river was used for trade and transport. Having developed an extensive network of irrigation canals, the river became important to the British Empire after it had colonized Burma. The river is still important today because it is used for a significant amount of traffic and (export) goods. In the Irrawaddy Delta, rice is grown using river water as an irrigation system.

In 2007, Myanmar's military dictatorship signed an agreement for the construction of seven hydroelectric dams, yielding a total 13,360 MW, in the N'mai and Mali Rivers, including the 3600 MW Myitsone Dam at the confluence of both rivers. Environmental organisations have raised concerns about the ecological impacts on the river's biodiverse ecosystems. Animals potentially impacted include the endangered Irrawaddy dolphin and the critically endangered Ganges shark.

Names
The name "Irrawaddy" is derived from Pali. Irāvatī or Airāvatī (Erāvatī in Pali) is the name of the elephant mount of Sakka and Indra in Hinduism. Saka is an important deva in Buddhism and elephants were often a symbol for water and was used as the name for several other rivers, such as the Achiravati. It can also be based on Iravati, who birthed the mythological elephant. The Irrawaddy gives its name to the Irrawaddy dolphin (Orcaella brevirostris), which is found in the lower reaches of the river and known to help fishermen who practice cast-net fishing. Though called Irrawaddy dolphin, it has been also found in the Bay of Bengal and the Indian Ocean.

During the Age of Discovery, the Irrawaddy was also known to European explorers as the Pegu as the main river of the Hanthawaddy Kingdom, itself known as Pegu after its capital, now romanized as Bago. The modern Pegu or Bago River is a separate river, tributary to the Yangon.

Physiography
The Irrawaddy River bisects Myanmar from north to south and empties through the nine-armed Irrawaddy Delta into the Indian Ocean.

Sources
The Irrawaddy River arises by the confluence of the N'mai (Nam Gio) and Mali Rivers in Kachin State. Both the N'mai and Mali Rivers find their sources in the Himalayan glaciers of Upper Burma near 28° N. The eastern branch of the two, N'mai, is the larger and rises in the Languela Glacier north of Putao. It is unnavigable because of the strong current whereas the smaller western branch, the Mali river, is navigable, despite a few rapids. Herefore, the Mali river is still called by the same name as the main river by locals. The controversial Myitsone Dam is no longer under construction at the convergence of these rivers.

Defiles
Between Myitkyina and Mandalay, the Irrawaddy flows through three well-marked defiles:
 Below Bhamo the river makes a sharp westward swing, leaving the Bhamo alluvial basin to cut through the limestone rocks of the second defile.
Between Katha and Mandalay, the course of the river is remarkably straight, flowing almost due south, except near Kabwet, where a sheet of lava has caused the river to bend sharply westward.
This sheet of lava is the Singu Plateau, a volcanic field from the Holocene. The plateau is also known as Letha Taung.

Leaving this plateau at Kyaukmyaung, the river follows a broad, open course through the central dry zone – the ancient cultural heartland – where large areas consist of alluvial flats. From Mandalay (the former capital of the kingdom of Myanmar), the river makes an abrupt westward turn before curving southwest to unite with the Chindwin River, after which it continues in a southwestern direction. It is probable that the upper Irrawaddy originally flowed south from Mandalay, discharging its water through the present Sittaung River to the Gulf of Martaban, and that its present westward course is geologically recent. Below its confluence with the Chindwin, the Irrawaddy continues to meander through the petroleum producing city of Yenangyaung, below which it flows generally southward. In its lower course, between Minbu and Pyay, it flows through a narrow valley between forest-covered mountain ranges—the ridge of the Arakan Mountains to the west and that of the Pegu Yoma Mountains to the east.

The Irrawaddy Delta

The westernmost distributary of the delta is the Pathein (Bassein) River, while the easternmost stream is the Yangon River, on the left bank of which stands Myanmar's former capital city, Yangon (Rangoon). Because the Yangon River is only a minor channel, the flow of water is insufficient to prevent Yangon Harbour from silting up, and dredging is necessary. The relief of the delta's landscape is low but not flat. The soils consist of fine silt, which is replenished continuously by fertile alluvium carried downstream by the river.

Hydrography

Due to monsoonal rains, which occur between mid-May and mid-October, the volume of the Irrawaddy and its tributaries varies greatly throughout the year. In summer, the melting of the snow and glaciers in Northern Burma add to the volume. The discharge can be as high as 40,393 cubic meter per second in rainy season. Over a year, the discharge averages . Further North, at Sagaing, the  shows a 38% decrease in discharge compared to where the river enters the delta. it also silted up around 278 tons of sand every year.

Variation between high and low waterlevel is also great. At Mandalay and Prome, a range of  has been measured between low-water level and floodlevel respectively. Because of the monsoonal character of the rain, the highest point is recorded in August, the lowest in February.

This variation in water level makes it necessary for ports along the river to have separate landing ports for low- and high-water.

Within the basin, the average population density is 79 people/km2. For these people, the river supply amounts to 18,614 m3 per person per year.

Sediments to the Sea

Collectively, the modern Ayeyarwady (Irrawaddy) and Thanlwin (Salween) rivers deliver >600 Mt/yr of sediment to the sea. Most recent study shows: 1) There is little modern sediment accumulating on the shelf immediately off the Ayeyarwady River mouths. In contrast, a major mud wedge with a distal depocenter, up to 60 m in thickness, has been deposited seaward in the Gulf of Martaban, extending to ~130 m water depth into the Martaban Depression. Further, 2) There is no evidence showing that modern sediment has accumulated or is transported into the Martaban Canyon; 3) There is a mud drape/blanket wrapping around the narrow western Myanmar Shelf in the eastern Bay of Bengal. The thickness of the mud deposit is up to 20 m nearshore and gradually thins to the slope at −300 m water depth, and likely escapes into the deep Andaman Trench; 4) The estimated total amount of Holocene sediments deposited offshore is ~1290 × 109 tons. If we assume this has mainly accumulated since the middle Holocene highstand (~6000 yr BP) like other major deltas, the historical annual mean depositional flux on the shelf would be 215 Mt/yr, which is equivalent to ~35% of the modern Ayeyarwady-Thanlwin rivers derived sediments; 5) Unlike other large river systems in Asia, such as the Yangtze and Mekong, this study indicates a bi-directional transport and depositional pattern controlled by the local currents that are influenced by tides, and seasonally varying monsoons winds and waves.

Ecology

No complete and precise list of all the fish in the Irrawaddy river basin currently exists, but in 1996 it was estimated that there are about 200 species. In 2008, it was estimated that the Irrawaddy ecoregion is home to 119–195 species of fish found nowhere else in the world (endemic). Several new species of fish have been described from the Irrawaddy river basin in recent years (for example, the cyprinid Danio htamanthinus in 2016 and the stone loach Malihkaia aligera in 2017), and it is likely that undescribed species remain.

Among the most well-known species in the river is the Irrawaddy dolphin (Orcaella brevirostris), a euryhaline species of oceanic dolphin with a high and rounded forehead, lacking a beak. It is found in discontinuous sub-populations near sea coasts and in estuaries and rivers in parts of the Bay of Bengal and South-East Asia.

Along the North-South course of the Irrawaddy River, a number of notably different ecoregions can be distinguished.

Northern Mountains
The streams of the Nmai and Mali that form the Irrawaddy originate in high and remote mountains near the border with Tibet. This part of Myanmar, which extends north from Myitkyina and the Irrawaddy confluence, lies entirely outside the tropics. Rain falls at all seasons of the year, but mostly in the summer. The valleys and lower hill ranges are covered with tropical and subtropical evergreen rainforest instead of monsoon (deciduous) forest. This region is characterised by subtropical and temperate forests of oak and pine are found at elevations above . This evergreen forest passes into sub-tropical pine forest at about  feet. Above , are forests of rhododendrons, and that in turn into evergreen conifer forest above  feet.

The Central Basin and Lowlands
The Irrawaddy river basin covers an approximate area of 255 . The Central Basin consists of the valley of the middle Irrawaddy and lower Chindwin. It lies within the 'dry zone' and consists almost entirely of plains covered with the teak-dominated Irrawaddy moist deciduous forests ecoregion, which surrounds dry forest patches in drier areas. The central basin receives little rain (ave 650mm per year) although it does flood quickly during the July–October storms. The one meteorological factor which does not vary greatly, and which is the most important for plant life, is atmospheric humidity. This is always high, except in the winter in certain localities. Humidity usually does not fall below 75% and is 90% or more for long periods during summer. Another feature is the prevalent southerly summer winds which erode the soil of the basin.

The natural habitats of this central zone have been much altered for farming and there are few protected areas.

Irrawaddy dry forests

The predominant trees of the drier patches are the thorny Terminalia oliveri and the hardwood dahat teak (Tectona hamiltoniana) with stands of Indaing (Dipterocarpus tuberculatus) which is cut for timber. The wildlife includes many birds, small mammals and reptiles such as the huge Burmese python. However, most of the large animals including the tiger have been hunted out or seen their habitats disappear.

Irrawaddy Delta Area

The Irrawaddy River and its tributaries flow into the Andaman Sea through the Irrawaddy Delta. This ecoregion consists of mangroves and freshwater swamp forests. It is an extremely fertile area because of the river-borne silt deposited in the delta. The upper and central portions of the delta are almost entirely under cultivation, principally for rice. The southern portion of the ecoregion transitions into the Burmese Coast mangroves and is made up of fanlike marshes with oxbow lakes, islands, and meandering streams.

Birds of the delta are both winter visitors and passage migrants including great cormorant (Phalacrocorax carbo), a wide variety of Anatidae, Eurasian coot (Fulica atra), about thirty species of migratory shorebirds, the whiskered tern (Chlidonias hybrida), the Caspian tern (Hydroprogne caspia), and the brown-headed gull (Larus brunnicephalus), which is very common. One of the most numerous wintering shorebird is the lesser sand plover (Charadrius mongolus), which occurs in flocks of many thousands along the outer coast of the delta. The wood sandpiper (Tringa glareola) and red junglefowl (Gallus gallus) are also abundant.

In the late 19th century, the spot-billed pelican (Pelecanus philippensis) nested in huge numbers in south Myanmar. One colony on the Sittaung River plain to the east of the delta was described in November 1877 as covering  and containing millions of birds. Immense colonies still bred in the area in 1910, but the birds had disappeared completely by 1939. Small numbers were regularly reported in the delta in the 1940s, but no breeding sites were located. , no pelicans have been recorded, and it may well be that the species is now extinct in Myanmar.

Several species of large mammal occur in the delta, but their populations are small and scattered, with the possible exceptions of the Malayan sambar deer (Cervus unicolor equinus), Indian hog deer (C. porcinus), and wild boar (Sus scrofa), which have been reported from all Reserved Forests. Asian elephants (Elephas maximus) were once widespread throughout the country with numbers as high as 10,000 animals, but in the  numbers have dwindled, partly due to transferring the animals to logging camps. Other species reported to be present include the leopard, Bengal tiger, crab-eating macaque, wild dog, and otters (Panthera pardus, P. tigris, Cuon alpinus, and Lutra species).

The saltwater crocodile (Crocodylus porosus) can be found in the southern part of the delta. The species was formerly abundant in coastal regions, but population numbers have decreased because of a combination of commercial skin hunting, habitat loss, drowning in fishing nets and over-collection of living animals to supply crocodile farms.

It was at this river that a battle between a saltwater crocodile and a tiger was observed that ended with the reptile devouring the tiger.

Despite recent declines in the sea turtle populations, five species are known to nest in Myanmar at well known island and mainland beaches known as turtle-banks. These are the olive ridley sea turtle (Lepidochelys olivacea), the loggerhead sea turtle (Caretta caretta), the green sea turtle (Chelonia mydas), the hawksbill sea turtle (Eretmochelys imbricata), and the leatherback sea turtle (Dermochelys coriacea).

Tributaries

The Irrawaddy River has five major tributaries. As they flow through the northern tip of Myanmar – the Kachin State – they cut long north-south alluvial plains and relatively narrow upland valleys between the  mountain ridges. The rivers joining the Irrawaddy are, from north to south:

Taping River
Shweli River
Myitnge River
Mu River
Chindwin River

Economy and politics

As early as the sixth century, the Bamars were using the Irrawaddy to gain power in the region through trade and transport on the China – India route. By the twelfth century, a well-developed network of canals made for flourishing rice cultivation. Later, the river became a key economic tool of Imperial British interests, who set up trading ports along its shores.

Today, the Irrawaddy is still the country's most important commercial waterway. Despite Mandalay's position as the chief rail and highway focus in northern Myanmar, a considerable amount of passenger and goods traffic moves by river. As the Irrawaddy Delta is one of the world's major rice-growing areas, one of the most important goods transported is rice. Teak logs – Myanmar is one of the world's top exporters – are floated down the river as large rafts. Before it is transported, teak has to be seasoned, because otherwise it won't float. This happens by girdling, a practice where a deep circular cut through bark and sapwood is made into the heartwood. Other major goods that are transported from the nation's heartlands to Yangon for export are other foodstuffs, petroleum, cotton, and local commodities.

Commercial transportation on the Irrawaddy is maintained for about : from Hinthada to Bhamo throughout the year, but from Bhamo to Myitkyina (200 km) for only seven months. Small steamers and country boats also serve the coasts of the Rakhine State and Tanintharyi Region. On the Chindwin River, transportation is carried on by steam or diesel vessels throughout the year up to Homalin—about 640 km from its confluence with the Irrawaddy.

The Chindwin valley has no railroad and relies heavily on river transport. Chauk, downstream from the confluence in the oil-field district, is a petroleum port. It is linked to Yangon by road and rail. Hinthada, near the apex of the delta, is the rail junction for lines leading to Kyangin and Bassein (Pathein). A ferry operates between Hinthada on the west bank and the railway station at Tharrawaw on the east bank.

Dams

Myanmar's military junta signed an agreement with China Power Investment Corporation in May 2007 for the construction of seven hydroelectric dams along the Irrawaddy, Mali, and N'Mai River in Kachin State. The total planned output of all seven plants will be 15,160 MWs of electricity, making it the largest hydropower project in Myanmar, surpassing the 7100 MW Tasang Dam in Shan State.
The following data is available for the dam locations:

The power generated by the dams will be transmitted to other countries in the South-East Asian region, with most going to China. Other countries targeted for power export are Thailand, India and Bangladesh.

The largest of the seven, the Myitsone Dam, is located at the confluence of the Mali and N'Mai Rivers at the creation of the Irrawaddy. Although the China Power Investment Corporation is project manager of the Confluence Region Hydropower Projects. ParConfluence Region Hydropower Projects, several companies have been or are currently involved in the preparation, construction and financing of the 3,600 MW Myitsone Dam. Asia World Company has a key position, amidst Burmese Suntac Technologies and state-run Myanmar Electrical Power Enterprise, a state-owned utility enterprise responsible for power generation, transmission and distribution

Chinese involvement comes from China Power Investment Corporation, China Southern Power Grid, Yunnan Machinery Equipment Import & Export Company Changjiang Institute of Surveying, Planning, Design and Research.

At least one Japanese company is involved, Kansai Electric Power Company.

Controversy
Due to its location and size, construction of the Myitsone Dam has raised significant ecological and sociological concerns. According to the Irrawaddy Myitsone Dam Multipurpose Water Utilizing Project study, the maximum water level of the reservoir will be 290 metres. This makes for a flood zone of 766 km2, compromising 47 villages.

Other consequences of the inundation include loss of farmland, loss of spawning habitat as fish can not swim upstream anymore. The Kachin Development Networking Group, a network of civil society groups and development organisations in Kachin State warn this will lead to a loss of income for fishermen. They report locals are also worried about the flooding of cultural sites in the flood zone. As with other large dam projects, the Myitsone Dam construction will alter the hydrological characteristics of the river, e.g. preventing sediment from enriching riverbanks downstream, where it usually enriches the riverside food-producing plains. This can affect fertility as far downstream as the Irrawaddy Delta, the major rice-producing area of Myanmar.

Ecological concerns focus on the inundation of an area that is the border of the Indo-Burma and South Central China biodiversity hotspots. The Mali and N'mai River confluence region falls within the Mizoram-Manipur-Kachin rainforests, added to the WWF list of outstanding examples of biodiverse regions.

The location of the Myitsone Dam, located less than 100 km from a fault line where the Eurasian and Indian tectonic plates meet, raised concerns about its earthquake resistance. Earthquakes in the region, such as the 5.3 magnitude earthquake that struck near the Myanmar-China border on 20 August 2008, prompted Naw Lar, the coordinator of the KDNG dam research project, to ask the junta to reconsider its dam projects.

Major cities and towns

The river flows through or past the following cities:

 Myitkyina
 Bhamo
 Katha
 Tagaung
 Kyaukmyaung
 Mandalay
 Sagaing
 Yenangyaung
 Chauk
 Bagan
 Nyaung-U

 Pyay
 Hinthada
 Pantanaw
.

Bridges

Until the construction of the Ava (Innwa) Bridge, a 16 span rail and road cantilever bridge built by the British colonial government in 1934, the only way across the Irrawaddy was by ferry. The bridge was destroyed by the retreating British Army during World War II and was rebuilt in 1954 after Burmese independence and was the only bridge to span the Irrawaddy until recent times when a spate of bridge construction has been carried out by the government.
Bala Min Htin Bridge over the N'Mai Hka at Myitkyina, November 1998
Ayeyarwady Bridge (Yadanabon) (Yadanar Pone Bridge/New Ava Bridge) at Mandalay, April 2008
Pakokku Bridge between Pakokku and Naung-U, December 2011
Anawrahta Bridge at Chauk, March 2001
Minbu Bridge at Magway
Nawaday Bridge at Pyay, September 1997
Ayeyarwady-Nyaungdon Bridge at Nyaungdon, November 2011
Bo Myat Tun Bridge at Nyaungdon, November 1999
Maubin Bridge at Maubin, February 1998
Ayeyarwady-Dedaye Bridge at Dedaye, March 2003

Gallery

See also

Irrawaddy Flotilla Company
 Ravi River

Notes

External links 
Rivers Network – Irrawaddy river blog and watershed webmap
On Thinner Ice 如履薄冰: signs of trouble from the Water Tower of Asia, where headwaters feed into all the great rivers of Asia (by GRIP, Asia Society and MediaStorm)
NASA Earth Observatory
Earth from Space NASA image

 
Rivers of Myanmar
Tropical and subtropical dry broadleaf forests